is a former Japanese football player.

Playing career
Chiba was born in Ishinomaki on April 11, 1971. After graduating from Juntendo University, he joined Japan Football League (JFL) club Toshiba in 1994. He played many matches as offensive midfielder from first season. In 1996, he moved to his local club Brummell Sendai in JFL. He played many matches and the club was promoted to J2 League from 1999. He retired end of 1999 season.

Club statistics

References

External links

1971 births
Living people
Juntendo University alumni
People from Ishinomaki
Association football people from Miyagi Prefecture
Japanese footballers
J2 League players
Japan Football League (1992–1998) players
Hokkaido Consadole Sapporo players
Vegalta Sendai players
Association football midfielders